Alexander or Alex Morrison may refer to:

Alexander Morrison (cricketer) (born 1937), New Zealand cricketer
Alexander Morrison (politician) (1851–1930), Canadian Member of Parliament
Alexander Morrison (headmaster) (1829–1903), Australian headmaster of Scotch College
Alexander Morrison (botanist) (1849–1913), Australian botanist
Alexander B. Morrison (1930–2018), Canadian scientist, academic, civil servant and leader in The Church of Jesus Christ of Latter-day Saints
 Alexander Francis Morrison, founder of Morrison & Foerster
Alexander Morrison (judge) (1927–2012), British judge
 Alex Morrison (Canadian Forces officer) (born 1941), former officer of the Canadian Forces
 Alex J. Morrison, golf instructor
 Alex Gene Morrison (born 1975), English artist
Alex Morrison, character in Alex in Wonderland
Alexander Morrison (police officer) (1927–2018), Scottish police officer